This is a list of Dutch television related events from 2006.

Events
11 March - Raffaëla Paton wins the third series of Idols, becoming the show's first female winner.
12 March - Treble are selected to represent Netherlands at the 2006 Eurovision Song Contest with their song "Amambanda". They are selected to be the forty-seventh Dutch Eurovision entry during Nationaal Songfestival held at Heineken Music Hall in Amsterdam.
14 May - Speed skater Barbara de Loor and her partner Marcus van Teijlingen win the second series of Dancing with the Stars.
28 October - Launch of the Dutch version of The X Factor.
27 November - Jeroen Visser wins the sixth and final series of Big Brother.

Debuts
28 October - X Factor (2006–present)

Television shows

1950s
NOS Journaal (1956–present)

1970s
Sesamstraat (1976–present)

1980s
Jeugdjournaal (1981–present)
Het Klokhuis (1988–present)

1990s
Goede tijden, slechte tijden (1990–present)
De Club van Sinterklaas (1999-2009)

2000s
Idols (2002-2008, 2016–present)
Dancing with the Stars (2005-2009)

Ending this year
Big Brother (1999-2006)

Births

Deaths

See also
2006 in the Netherlands

References